The 2024 U Sports Women's Ice Hockey Championship is scheduled to be held March 14–17, 2024, in Saskatoon, Saskatchewan, to determine a national champion for the 2023–24 U Sports women's ice hockey season. The tournament will be hosted by the Saskatchewan Huskies.

Host
The tournament is scheduled to be played at Merlis Belsher Place on the campus of the University of Saskatchewan. This is scheduled to be the first time that the University of Saskatchewan will host the tournament.

Scheduled teams
Canada West Representative
OUA Representative
RSEQ Representative
AUS Representative
Host (Saskatchewan Huskies)
Three additional berths

References

External links 
 Tournament Web Site

U Sports women's ice hockey
Ice hockey competitions in Saskatchewan
2023–24 in Canadian ice hockey
2024 in Saskatchewan